Peckoltia wernekei is a species of catfish in the family Loricariidae. It is native to South America, where it occurs in the Ventuari River, which is a tributary of the Orinoco in the state of Amazonas in Venezuela. The species reaches at least 10.46 cm (4.1 inches) SL. 

It was described in 2016 by Jonathan W. Armbruster (of Auburn University) and Nathan K. Lujan based on morphological and genetic differences between it and other members of Peckoltia, including P. vittata, which it was formerly considered to be conspecific with. Its specific epithet, wernekei, honors David C. Werneke, Collection Manager of Fishes at Auburn University. FishBase does not list this species.

P. wernekei occasionally appears in the aquarium trade, where it is referred to either as the orange tiger pleco or by one of two associated L-numbers, which are L-243 and LDA-086.

References 

Ancistrini
Fish described in 2016